Wighton Halt is a railway station serving the small village of Wighton, Norfolk. It is a public railway station, originally part of the standard gauge network, and now part of the narrow gauge Wells and Walsingham Light Railway.

LNER
Wighton Halt was a railway station on the Wells and Fakenham Railway, later part of the Great Eastern Railway. It was opened on 1 February 1924  by the London and North Eastern Railway and operated by them until rail nationalisation. It closed on 5 October 1964 as part of the Beeching cuts on the British railway network.

W&WLR

In 1979 construction work began to reopen four miles of the disused railway line between Wells and Walsingham. The narrow gauge Wells & Walsingham Light Railway began operations in April 1982, at which time Wighton railway station reopened, but with the new name of "Seton's Halt". A new station, on the northern side of the village, took the name Wighton Halt. By 2005 it was evident that Wighton village did not require two stations, so the new Wighton Halt was closed, and Seton's Halt reverted to its original name of Wighton. Although it is a request stop, the "halt" suffix does not appear on the station name boards or on timetables.

References

 
 
 https://web.archive.org/web/20081006135523/http://www.norfolkrailwaysociety.org.uk/news_may-jun05.html

Disused railway stations in Norfolk
Heritage railway stations in Norfolk
Former London and North Eastern Railway stations
Railway stations in Great Britain opened in 1924
Railway stations in Great Britain closed in 1964
Beeching closures in England